is a passenger railway station located in Takatsu-ku, Kawasaki, Kanagawa Prefecture, Japan, operated by East Japan Railway Company (JR East).

Lines
Mizonokuchi Station on the Tōkyū Den-en-toshi and Oimachi lines is located next to this station.

Station layout
The station consists of one side platform for ascending traffic (for Kawasaki), and one island platform for descending traffic (for Tachikawa). Platform 3 is used for services originating at this station. The station building was rebuilt as an elevated station in 1998. The station has a Midori no Madoguchi staffed ticket office.

Platforms

History
Musashi-Mizonokuchi Station opened as a station on the Nambu Railway on 9 March 1927. The Nambu Railway was nationalized on 1 April 1944, becoming part of the Japanese Government Railway (JGR) system, which became the Japan National Railways (JNR) from 1946. Freight services were discontinued on 1 March 1976. Along with privatization and division of JNR, JR East started operating the station on 1 April 1987.

Passenger statistics
In fiscal 2019, the station was used by an average of 86,165 passengers daily (boarding passengers only).

The passenger figures (boarding passengers only) for previous years are as shown below.

See also
 List of railway stations in Japan

References

External links

  

Railway stations in Kanagawa Prefecture
Railway stations in Japan opened in 1927
Railway stations in Kawasaki, Kanagawa